Charles Perkins Thompson (July 30, 1827 – January 19, 1894) was a member of the United States House of Representatives from Massachusetts.  He was born in Braintree on July 30, 1827 to Frederick M. and Susanna (Cheesman) Thompson.  He attended public schools, the Hollis Institute, and Amherst College. He studied law, was admitted to the bar and commenced practice in Gloucester.

Thompson served as United States Assistant District Attorney from 1855 to 1857, was elected a member of the Massachusetts House of Representatives, and was a delegate to the Democratic National Convention in 1872. He was elected as a Democrat to the Forty-fourth Congress (March 4, 1875 – March 3, 1877), defeating Republican Benjamin Butler.  Thompson was an unsuccessful candidate for reelection to the Forty-fifth Congress.

Thompson resumed the practice of law, and served as city solicitor of Gloucester. He was an unsuccessful Democratic candidate for Governor of Massachusetts in 1880 and again in 1881, and served as judge of the Superior Court of Massachusetts from 1885 until his death in Gloucester on January 19, 1894.  His interment was in Oak Grove Cemetery.

See also
 1872 Massachusetts legislature

References

External links
 

Democratic Party members of the Massachusetts House of Representatives
Thompson, Charles P.
1827 births
1894 deaths
Democratic Party members of the United States House of Representatives from Massachusetts
19th-century American politicians